The red-footed booby (Sula sula) is a large seabird of the booby family, Sulidae. Adults always have red feet, but the colour of the plumage varies. They are powerful and agile fliers, but they are clumsy in takeoffs and landings. They are found widely in the tropics, and breed colonially in coastal regions, especially islands. The species faces few natural or man-made threats, although its population is declining; it is considered to be a least-concern species by the International Union for Conservation of Nature (IUCN).

Taxonomy
The first formal description of the red-footed booby was by the Swedish naturalist Carl Linnaeus in 1766 in the twelfth edition of his Systema Naturae. He introduced the binomial name Pelecanus sula. The type locality is Barbados in the West Indies. The present genus Sula was introduced by the French scientist Mathurin Jacques Brisson in 1760. The word Sula is Norwegian for a gannet.

There are three subspecies:

 S. s. sula (Linnaeus, 1766) – Caribbean and southwest Atlantic islands
 S. s. rubripes Gould, 1838 – tropical Pacific and Indian Oceans
 S. s. websteri Rothschild, 1898 – eastern central Pacific

Description

It has red legs, and its bill and throat pouch are coloured pink and blue. This species has several morphs. In the white morph the plumage is mostly white (the head often tinged yellowish) and the flight feathers are black. The black-tailed white morph is similar, but with a black tail, and can easily be confused with the Nazca and masked boobies. The brown morph is overall brown. The white-tailed brown morph is similar, but has a white belly, rump, and tail. The white-headed and white-tailed brown morph has a mostly white body, tail and head, and brown wings and back. The morphs commonly breed together, but in most regions one or two morphs predominates; for example, at the Galápagos Islands, most belong to the brown morph, though the white morph also occurs.

The sexes are similar, and juveniles are brownish with darker wings, and pale pinkish legs, while chicks are covered in dense white down.

The species has been recorded three times from Sri Lanka.

In March 2016, footage of a red-footed booby being caught and killed by a coconut crab was recorded on the Chagos Archipelago. After the coconut crab killed the bird, five others were observed being drawn to the site, where they competed over the meat.

In September 2016, a male red-footed booby was found washed up on a beach in East Sussex, UK, 5,000 miles from its nearest usual habitat. It was the first of its species ever recorded in the UK. The bird, later named Norman, was exhausted and malnourished. He was brought back to health before being transported by plane to an environmental center in the Cayman Islands in December 2016, where he subsequently died before ever being released into the wild. As a result of Norman's appearance, the red-footed booby was formally added to the British List by the British Ornithologists' Union on 16 August 2017.

In January 2017, a red-footed booby was sighted on the New Zealand mainland for the first time.

Breeding

This species breeds on islands in most tropical oceans. When not breeding it spends most of the time at sea, and is therefore rarely seen away from breeding colonies. It nests in large colonies, laying one chalky blue egg in a stick nest, which is incubated by both adults for 44–46 days. The nest is usually placed in a tree or bush, but rarely it may nest on the ground. It may be three months before the young first fly, and five months before they make extensive flights.

Red-footed booby pairs may remain together over several seasons. They perform elaborate greeting rituals, including harsh squawks and the male's display of his blue throat, also including short dances.

Diet
Red-footed boobies dive into the ocean at high speeds to catch prey. They mainly eat small fish (such as flying fish) or squid which gather in groups near the surface.

Conservation
The International Union for Conservation of Nature (IUCN) lists the red-footed booby as a species of least concern, though the population worldwide is decreasing. The warm phase (El Niño) of the El Niño–Southern Oscillation in 1982 and 1983 negatively affected breeding on Christmas Island as higher water temperatures reduced food supply. Where usually 6000 pairs nested, 30 pairs  and the around 60 pairs attempted breeding in 1982 and 1983 respectively.

References

 Hilty. Birds of Venezuela. 

red-footed booby
Birds of French Polynesia
Birds of the Caribbean
Birds of Hawaii
Birds of Palau
Birds of the Dominican Republic
Birds of Haiti
Birds of Puerto Rico
Birds of Trinidad and Tobago
Birds of Ascension Island
Birds of the Cayman Islands
Birds of the British Virgin Islands
Birds of the Atlantic Ocean
Birds of the Indian Ocean
Birds of the Pacific Ocean
Galápagos Islands coastal fauna
Natural history of the Northwestern Hawaiian Islands
red-footed booby
red-footed booby
Pantropical fauna